The 2016 Copa do Brasil de Futebol Feminino is the tenth staging of the competition. The competition started on August 24, 2016, and concluded on October 26, 2016. 32 clubs of all regions of Brazil participated of the cup, which was organized by the Brazilian Football Confederation (CBF).

It was the last staging of the competition, as it was abolished the next year.

Competition format
The competition is contested by 32 clubs in a knock-out format where all rounds are played over two legs and the away goals rule was used, but in the first two rounds, if the away team won the first leg with an advantage of at least three goals, the second leg would not be played and the club automatically qualified to the next round.

Participating teams 

a. Audax joined a partnership with Corinthians to participate in the 2016 edition of the competition, thus being represented by them.

Table

 In italics, the home teams in the first legs of each round.

b. Barcelona and União were excluded from the competition after fielding ineligible players.

Final

References

External links
Official website

2016
2016 domestic association football cups
2016 in Brazilian women's football